FC Sipan, is defunct Armenian football club from the Spandaryan village of Shirak Province. It was dissolved in 1993 and is currently inactive from professional football. The club played its home games at the village's football ground named after Hamlet Mkhitaryan.

References

Sipan Artik
1993 disestablishments in Armenia